Skavoovie and the Epitones is an American ten piece ska band that formed in Newton, and Wellesley, Massachusetts, United States, in 1994.

Skavoovie and the Epitones have a traditional 1960s ska sound with heavy jazz and big band influences.  The band was signed to Moon Ska Records before the members had finished high school, and they released their debut album Fat Footin'  in 1995. Fat Footin was one of the fastest selling albums for Moon Ska.

Their blend of new and old styles of ska is apparent in songs such as "She Sure Can Cook."  They have released albums in Europe and Japan and have appeared on over a dozen music compilations.  Their musically diverse album Ripe was released in 1997, featuring songs such as "Blood Red Sky" and "Drunk". The album showcases their lighter side with songs such as "Aquaman".  After upwards of a thousand live shows and numerous US and European tours, the band became inactive in 1999 because the members were in college.

Guitarist Kevin Micka is actively touring for his project Animal Hospital. Ansis Purins, a 2010 Xeric grant recipient, works as a freelance illustrator and self-publishes his comic series "Zombre." Ethan D'Ercole now plays in the Chicago-based band, The Watchers. Ben Jaffe is now playing with the Brooklyn-based Black Tabby and is sometimes called "Gary". Eugene Cho is a principal member of the Brooklyn-based disco band Escort, and also runs a music studio and writes music for television shows and commercials. Ben Herson is the founder of the hip hop record label and production company, Nomadic Wax. Daniel Neely is an ethnomusicologist and has a Ph.D. from New York University.  His dissertation was about Jamaican mento music and he played banjo and was the music director for the Jolly Boys' album "Great Expectation".  Jon Natchez is touring with Zach Condon's band Beirut, playing a variety of wind, string, and percussion instruments.  Ben Lewis is a computational biologist who has made major discoveries regarding the extensive influence of microRNAs on the human genome. Dr. Joe Wensink is now an English professor and English department chair at the South Carolina Governor's School for Science and Mathematics.

Lineup 
 Ansis Purins (Vocals)
 Ben Herson (Drums)
 Ben Jaffe (Tenor sax)
 Eugene Cho (Keyboards)
 Jesse Farber (Trumpet)
 Eric Jalbert (Trumpet)
 Joe Wensink (Euphonium)
 Ethan D'Ercole (Guitar)
 Kevin Micka (Guitar)
 Daniel Neely (Guitar)
 Ben Lewis (Trumpet)
 Jon Natchez (Flute, Alto & Baritone sax)
 Rob Jost (Bass)

Discography 
 An Evening With Skavoovie (1994)
 Fat Footin''' (1995)
 "Beardman Ska" / "Riverboat" 7" (1996)
 Ripe (1997)
 Super Ripe! (1998) Japanese Release
 The Growler'' (1999)

References

External links 

Third-wave ska groups
American ska musical groups